This article lists all the confirmed national football squads for the 1989 European Competition for Women's Football.

Players marked (c) were named as captain for their national squad.

Head coach:  Gero Bisanz

Head coach:  Sergio Guenza

Head coach:  Erling Hokstad

Head coach:  Gunilla Paijkull

Source: Swedish Football Association

References

External links
 1989 - Match Details at RSSSF.com

UEFA Women's Championship squads
Squads